The Last Roman Emperor was a legendary figure in medieval Christian eschatology. 

Last Roman Emperor may also refer to:

Romulus Augustulus (475–476), de facto last Western Roman Emperor
Julius Nepos (474–480), de jure last Western Roman Emperor
Constantine VI (780–797), last emperor to be contemporaneously recognized universally as Roman Emperor
Constantine XI Palaiologos (1449–1453), last Byzantine (Eastern Roman) Emperor
Francis II (1792–1806), last Holy Roman Emperor

See also 
Last of the Romans, Ultimus Romanorum
Roman Empire (disambiguation)